Zembrzus-Mokry Grunt  is a village in the administrative district of Gmina Janowo, within Nidzica County, Warmian-Masurian Voivodeship, in northern Poland.

The village has a population of 170.

References

Zembrzus-Mokry Grunt